The Kannada script (IAST: Kannaḍa lipi; obsolete: Kanarese or Canarese script in English) is an abugida of the Brahmic family, used to write Kannada, one of the Dravidian languages of South India especially in the state of Karnataka. It is one of the official scripts of the Indian Republic. Kannada script is also widely used for writing Sanskrit texts in Karnataka. Several minor languages, such as Tulu, Konkani, Kodava, Sanketi and Beary, also use alphabets based on the Kannada script. The Kannada and Telugu scripts share very high mutual intellegibility with each other, and are often considered to be regional variants of single script. Other scripts similar to Kannada script are Sinhala script (which included some elements from the Kadamba script), and Old Peguan script
(used in Burma).

The Kannada script ( akṣaramāle or  varṇamāle) is a phonemic abugida of forty-nine letters. The character set is almost identical to that of other Brahmic scripts. Consonantal letters imply an inherent vowel.  Letters representing consonants are combined to form digraphs ( ottakṣara) when there is no intervening vowel. Otherwise, each letter corresponds to a syllable.

The letters are classified into three categories:  svara (vowels),  vyañjana (consonants), and   yōgavāhaka (semiconsonants).

The Kannada words for a letter of the script are  akshara,  akkara, and  varṇa. Each letter has its own form ( ākāra) and sound ( śabda), providing the visible and audible representations, respectively. Kannada is written from left to right.

History
The Brahmi script evolved into the Kadamba script by the 5th century, which in turn developed into the Kannada-Telugu script (or 'Old Kannada script') in the 7th century. The Kannada and Telugu scripts then separated by around 1300 C.E.

Over the centuries some changes have been made to the Kannada script. These changes consist of:
 Modification of existing glyphs: In the early Kannada script, no orthographic distinction was made between the short mid  ,  and long mid  , . However, distinct signs were employed to denote the special consonants viz. the trill   the retroflex lateral   and the retroflex rhotic  , by the 5th century.
The introduction was done so that Sanskrit (and loanwords into the Kannada language from the donor language Sanskrit) could be written using the Kannada script. These changes have facilitated the use of the Kannada script for writing many of the literary Indic languages, including Sanskrit.

Vowel letters
There are thirteen (fourteen if the obsolete vowel ೠ is included) vowel letters ( svara).

When a vowel follows a consonant, it is written with a diacritic rather than as a separate letter.

Yōgavāha 
The Yōgavāha (part-vowel, part consonant) include two letters:
 The anusvara:   (aṁ)
 The visarga:   (aḥ)

Another two Yōgavāha used in Sanskrit, but present in Kannada script, are known as Ardhavisarga:
 The Jihvamuliya:  
 The Upadhmaniya:

Consonant letters 
Two categories of consonant letters ( vyan̄jana) are defined in Kannada: the structured consonants and the unstructured consonants.

Structured consonants

The structured consonants are classified according to where the tongue touches the palate of the mouth and are classified accordingly into five structured groups. These consonants are shown here with their ISO transcriptions.

Unstructured consonants
The unstructured consonants are consonants that do not fall into any of the above structures:

 (ya),
 (ra),
 (ṟa; obsolete),
 (la),
 (va),
 (śa),
 (ṣa),
 (sa),
 (ha),
,
 (ḻ; obsolete).

Consonant conjuncts

The Kannada script is rich in conjunct consonant clusters, with most consonants having a standard subjoined form and few true ligature clusters. A table of consonant conjuncts follows although the forms of individual conjuncts may differ according to the font.

Consonant conjuncts with ರ (ra)

Of special note is the sequence concerning the letter  (ra). Unlike other letters, the conjunct form is written second even if it is pronounced first in the sequence.

For example, the /rnaː/ in the word Karnāṭaka (ಕರ್ನಾಟಕ) is written ರ್ನಾ rather than ರ‍್ನಾ.

Consonant conjuncts with nasal consonants

The nasal consonants 

Obsolete Kannada letters 

The letters dropped out of use in the 12th and 18th centuries, respectively.

It is still used to write the Badaga language and a vowel + virama + ḻ is used to transcribe its retroflex vowels.

Another letter (or unclassified vyanjana (consonant)) that has become extinct is 'nh' or 'inn'. Likewise, this has its equivalent in Telugu, where it is called Nakaara pollu. The usage of this consonant was observed until the 1980s in Kannada works from the mostly coastal areas of Karnataka (especially the Dakshina Kannada district). Now, hardly any mainstream works use this consonant.

Places of articulation 
There are five classifications of passive articulations:
 Kaṇṭhya: Velar
 Tālavya: Palatal
 Mūrdhanya: Retroflex
 Dantya: Dental
 Ōshtya: Labial

Apart from that, other places are combinations of the above five: 
 Dantōsthya: Labio-dental (E.g.: v)
 Kantatālavya: E.g.: Diphthong e
 Kantōsthya: labial-velar (E.g.: Diphthong o)

The attempt of articulation of consonants (Uccāraṇa Prayatna) is of two types,
 Bāhya Prayatna: External effort
 Spṛṣṭa: Plosive
 Īshat Spṛṣṭa: Approximant
 Īshat Saṃvṛta: Fricative
 Abhyantara Prayatna: Internal effort
 Alpaprāna: Unaspirated
 Mahāprāna: Aspirated
 Śvāsa: Unvoiced
 Nāda: Voiced

Articulation of consonants 
Articulation of consonants is be logical combination of components in the two prayatnams. The below table gives a view upon articulation of consonants.

Pronunciation of letters 

*archaic

Writing order

Akshara
Written Kannada is composed of akshara or kagunita, corresponding to syllables. The letters for consonants combine with diacritics for vowels. This is called  dīrgha. A consonant without a vowel is marked with a 'killer' stroke, such as  k. This is known as  hrasva.

The formations shown boldface above are seldom used in the normal course of the language.

Numerals 

The decimal numerals in the script are:

Transliteration 

Several transliteration schemes/tools are used to type Kannada characters using a standard keyboard. These include Baraha (based on ITRANS), Pada Software and several internet tools like Google transliteration, Quillpad (predictive transliterator). Nudi, the Government of Karnataka's standard for Kannada Input, is a phonetic layout loosely based on transliteration.

In popular culture

Due to its resemblance to an eye and an eyebrow, the Kannada letter  ṭha is used in the "look of disapproval" (displayed as "ಠ_ಠ"), a popular emoticon used to convey disapproval or contempt. Similarly, the akshara  rr̥a has been used in emoticons to represent a monocle, while  tha has been used to represent a tearing eye.

Unicode

Kannada script was added to the Unicode Standard in October, 1991 with the release of version 1.0.

The Unicode block for Kannada is U+0C80–U+0CFF:

See also
 
Pyu script
Goykanadi
Bhattiprolu script
Kannada Braille
Kannada grammar
Kannada literature
Kannada poetry
Lari
Official script
Telugu script
Grantha script
ISO 15919

References

External links

  — South and Southeast Asian Scripts
 — Kannada Code Chart 
Kannada alphabet — From Omniglot

Brahmic scripts
Kannada language
Konkani
Tulu language
Alphabets
Officially used writing systems of India